Pinsk is a city in Brest Region, Belarus, located in the region of Polesia, at the confluence of the Pina River and the Pripyat River. The region was known as the Pinsk Marshes and is southwest of Minsk. The population is 138,415.

The historic city has a restored city centre, with two-storey buildings from the 19th and early 20th centuries. The centre has become an active place for youths of all ages with summer theme parks and a new association football stadium, which houses the city's football club, FC Volna Pinsk.

History

Timeline up to WWI
In the 9th and 10th centuries, the town of Pinsk was majority Lithuanian
1097 – the first mention of Pinsk
 1241 – transfer of the Orthodox diocese from Turov
 1316 – after this date, Pinsk was incorporated into the Grand Duchy of Lithuania
 1396 – a Catholic church and a Franciscan monastery were erected
 1523 – Pinsk becomes a royal city, first owned by Queen Bona
 1569 – Pinsk becomes a seat of the poviat
 1581 – king Stephen Báthory grants Pinsk city rights
 1642–1646 - Saint Andrew Bobola stayed in the Jesuit monastery in Pinsk and nearby, conducting evangelistic activity
 1648 – rebellion of the city and admission of Cossack forces under the command of Colonel Maxim Hładki. The slaughter of burghers not of the Orthodox religion. The assault of Janusz Radziwiłł's troops on the city, under the command of the hetman Hrehory Mirski of about 1200–1300 people, ended with the capture of the city. The city was burned to the ground and about 1/3 – 1/2 of the inhabitants were killed (it is estimated that on the eve of the Khmelnytsky Uprising, Pinsk had about 10,000 inhabitants)
 1655 – Russians and Cossacks attacked the city and murdered many inhabitants.
 1657 – in mid-May Zdanowicz's cossacks (about 2,000) destroyed the city and murdered many Roman Catholics. Jesuits, incl. Fr. Simon Maffon and Saint Andrew Bobola
 1660 – Cossacks attacked Pinsk, robbed a Jesuit college and church, and murdered, among others Fr. Eustachy Piliński
 1662 – return of the Jesuits to Pinsk, fire of the monastery after a year
 1666 – foundation of the Dominican monastery
 1690 – foundation of the Karolin settlement by Jan Karol Dolski
 1695 – construction of a church and castle in Carolina by Michał Serwacy Wiśniowiecki
 1706 – from May 5 to June 3. The capture of Pinsk by King of Sweden Charles XII. Blowing up the castle of Michał Serwacy Wiśniowiecki
 1707 – the occupation of Pinsk by the army of General Halast and General Hołowina
 1709–1710 and in 1716: a great epidemic with thousands of victims
 1717 – construction of the Bernardine monastery
 1734 – construction of a Carmelite monastery
 1756 – construction of the Mariavite Order [de] monastery
 1767 – construction of the Ogiński Channel
 1775 – construction of the Royal Canal
 1793 – the Second Partition of the Commonwealth. Pinsk now belongs to Russian Empire.
 1795 – establishment of the Catholic diocese of Pinsk (previously Pinsk was in the diocese of Lutsk)
 1799 – the incorporation of Karolina into Pinsk
 1796 – the liquidation of the Uniate diocese of Pinsk
 1799 – liquidation of the Pinsk Catholic diocese (it was moved to Minsk)
 1812 – in July, Pinsk was taken by Napoleon's army
 1850 – a candle and soap factory was established
 1882 – a railway line was brought from Żabinka and a match factory was opened
 1885 – construction of a river shipyard in Leszcze
 1907–1909: a provincial circle of the Polish Education Association in Minsk operated in the city, which organized lectures on Polish literature and vocabulary, which, according to a report by the Russian police, "increased Polish national consciousness".
 1909 – during the local elections 22 Belarusians (orthodox), 7 Poles (catholics), 2 Jews and 1 representative of other nationalities were elected to the city council
 1915 – Russian authorities abandon the city escaping from advancing German forces

WWI and Polish–Soviet War
Pinsk was occupied by the German Empire on 15 September 1915, during the First World War. After the German defeat, Pinsk became the subject of dispute between the Belarusian People's Republic and the Ukrainian People's Republic, both short-lived. Pinsk was taken by the advancing Red Army on 25 January 1919, during the Soviet westward offensive of 1918–19. It was retaken by Polish troops on 5 March 1919 during the Polish–Soviet War but was retaken by the Red Army on 23 July 1920 and finally retaken by the Polish on 26 September 1920. Pińsk became part of the reborn Poland in 1920 when the Polish-Soviet War ended with the Peace of Riga, signed in March 1921.

Like many other cities in Eastern Europe, Pinsk had a significant Jewish population before World War II. According to the Russian census of 1897, out of the total number of 28,400 inhabitants, Jews were approximately 74% of the population (21,100 persons), making it one of the most Jewish cities under tsarist rule. During the Polish-Soviet War, 35 Jewish civilians from Pinsk were executed by the Polish Army in April 1919 after being accused of collaborating with Russian Bolsheviks. The incident, known as the Pinsk massacre, created a diplomatic crisis noted at the Versailles Conference.

Interwar period
Pińsk was the initial capital of the Polesie Voivodeship, but it moved to Brześć-nad-Bugiem (now Brest, Belarus) after a citywide fire on 7 September 1921. The population of the city grew rapidly in interwar Poland from 23,497 in 1921 to 33,500 in 1931. Pińsk became a bustling commercial centre, and 70% of the population was Jewish, in spite of considerable migration.

Second World War
Following the Soviet invasion of Poland in 1939, Pinsk and the surrounding area was annexed to the Byelorussian Soviet Socialist Republic. It was the seat of the Pinsk Oblast from 1940.

After Operation Barbarossa, Germany occupied Pinsk from 4 July 1941 to 14 July 1944, as part of the Reichskommissariat Ukraine. Most Jews were killed in late October 1942 during the liquidation of the Pińsk Ghetto by the German Ordnungspolizei and the Byelorussian Auxiliary Police, 10,000 being murdered in one day. In 1945, after postwar border adjustments of Poland, Pinsk again became part of the Byelorussian Soviet Socialist Republic.

Post-WWII: USSR; Belarus state
In 1954 it became part of the Brest Voblast.

Pinsk has formed part of the Republic of Belarus since Belarusian independence from the Soviet Union in 1991.

Landmarks
Three main sights of the town are lined along the river: the Assumption Cathedral of the Monastery of the Greyfriars (1712–1730), with a campanile from 1817, the Jesuit collegium (1635–1648); a large Mannerist complex, whose cathedral was demolished after World War II by communists; and the Butrymowicz Palace (1784–1790), built for Mateusz Butrymowicz, an important political and economical figure of Pinsk and Polesie. The Church of St. Charles Borromeo (1770—1782) and St. Barbara Cathedral of the Monastery of the St. Bernard Order (1786–1787) are placed near historic centre in the former Karolin suburb, which is now part of Pinsk. The foremost modern building is the black-domed Orthodox Cathedral of St. Theodore.

Climate

Notable residents
 Aaron of Pinsk (died 1841), rabbi
 Matheus Butrymowicz (1745–1814), Polish-Lithuanian statesman, reformer of Polesye
 Vladimir Chub (1948–), governor of Rostov Oblast in Russia
 Vintsent Dunin-Martsinkyevich, (1808–1884), Belarusian writer, poet, dramatist and social activist, author of the play Pinskaya shlyakhta' 
 Baruch Epstein (1860–1941), bookkeeper, rabbi and prolific Jewish scholar, best known for his Torah Temimah commentary on the Torah
 William Moses Feldman (1880–1939), child physiologist, born in Pinsk
 Semyon Furman (1920–1978), Chess grandmaster and trainer of World Champion Anatoly Karpov
 Jonah Gogol (?– 1602), Orthodox and later an Uniate bishop
 Olga Govortsova, (1988–) Belarusian tennis player
 Chaim Kanievsky (1928–2022), prominent Rabbi
 Ryszard Kapuściński (1932–2007), Polish writer and reporter
 Igor Kolb (1977–), principal dancer of Mariinsky Ballet
 Andrzej Kondratiuk (1936–2016), Polish film director, screenwriter, actor, and cinematographer
 Simon Kuznets (1901–1985), 1971 Nobel laureate in economics
 parents of Ralph Lauren, American fashion designer lived in Pinsk before moving to the U.S.A
 Golda Meir (1898–1978), fourth prime minister of Israel, born in Kiev, lived two years of her childhood in Pinsk
 Shabsay Moshkovsky (1895–1982), noted physician, research scientist and malariologist
 Adam Naruszewicz (1733–1796), Polish-Lithuanian poet, historian, bishop
 Narymunt, (1277–1348), Prince of Pinsk
 Theodore Odrach (1912–1964), Ukrainian and Polesian writer of novels, short stories and memoirs
 Napoleon Orda (1807–1883), Polish-Lithuanian musician, pianist, composer and artist
 Sławomir Rawicz (1915–2004), Polish Army lieutenant, claimed to have walked from Siberia to India during World War II
 Bona Sforza, (1494–1557), Queen consort of Poland and Grand Duchess consort of Lithuania, Princess of Pinsk
 Yauhen Shatokhin (1947–2012), Belarusian painter and political activist
 Izya Shlosberg (1950–), Jewish American artist, born in Pinsk and lived in Pinsk for 44 years
 Sir Isaac Shoenberg (1880–1963), electrical engineer born in Pinsk, principal inventor of the first high-definition television system, as used by the BBC
 Helena Skirmunt (1827–1874), Polesian painter and sculptor
 Raman Skirmunt (1868–1939), Belarusian and Polesian statesman, aristocrat and landlord
 Kazimierz Świątek (1914–2011), Cardinal of the Roman Catholic Church, Metropolitan Archbishop of Minsk-Mohilev and Apostolic Administrator of Pinsk
 Chaim Weizmann (1874–1952), first president of Israel, born in Motal, near Pinsk and educated in Pinsk
 Tatiana Woollaston (1986–), professional snooker referee, born in Pinsk
 Leo Zeitlin (1884–1930), composer, born in Pinsk before studying in Odessa and later moving to the U.S.A.
 Ivan Zholtovsky (1867–1959), Soviet architect and educator

References

Further reading
 Mordechai Nadav (2008) The Jews of Pinsk, 1506–1880; edited by Mark Jay Mirsky and Moshe Rosman; translated by Moshe Rosman and Faigie Tropper. Stanford, Calif: Stanford University Press,
 (In Belarusian, Russian and English) T. A. Khvagina (2007) Pinsk and Its Surroundings, Minsk Vysheysha shkola,
 (In Belarusian, Russian and English) T. A. Khvagina (2004) Pinsk: A Fairy Tale of Polessye, Minsk Vysheysha shkola,
 (In Belarusian, Russian and English) T. A. Khvagina (2005) POLESYE from the Bug to the Ubort, Minsk Vysheysha shkola, .

External links

 Yad Yisroel - Pinsk
 "The Jews of Pinsk" by Jeremy Rosen. The Algemeiner, July 28, 2013.
 Jewish Community in Pinsk on Virtual Shtetl
 Photos on Radzima.org
 "The city of Pinsk, Belarus" by Tatyana Khvagina and Oleg Babinets
 "Pinsk", Jewish Encyclopedia''
 Images of the Assumption Cathedral
 Image of the Jesuit Collegium 
 Virtual Guide to Belarus: Pinsk
 News from Pinsk
 

 
Brest Litovsk Voivodeship
Cities in Belarus
Holocaust locations in Belarus
Pinsky Uyezd
Polesie Voivodeship
Populated places established in the 11th century
Populated places in Brest Region
Shtetls
Jewish communities destroyed in the Holocaust